Bobby Holmes (born 25 July 1932) is a Scottish former football player, who played for St Mirren in the Scottish Football League. Holmes was forced to retire in 1959 due to injury.

Holmes played once for the Scottish Football League XI, in 1957.

References

External links 

1932 births
Living people
Footballers from Coatbridge
Association football inside forwards
Scottish footballers
Kilsyth Rangers F.C. players
St Mirren F.C. players
Scottish Football League players
Scottish Football League representative players
Scotland under-23 international footballers
Scottish Junior Football Association players